The Serpent Island gecko (Nactus serpensinsula) is a species of lizard in the family Gekkonidae. The species is endemic to Mauritius.

The Serpent Island gecko is a monotypic species, it is only found in the Serpent Island of Mauritius. The Durrell's night gecko, endemic to the Round Island, was previously treated as a subspecies of Serpent Island gecko.

On Mauritius itself, it is only known from fossils.

References

Further reading
Arnold EN, Jones CG (1994). "The night geckos of the genus Nactus in the Mascarene Islands with a description of the population on Round Island". Dodo 30: 119-131. (Nactus serpensinsula durrelli [sic], new subspecies).
Loveridge A (1951). "A New Gecko of the Genus Gymnodactylus from Serpent Island". Proc. Biol. Soc. Washington 64: 91-92. (Gymnodactylus serpensinsula, new species).
Michels JP, Bauer AM (2004). "Some corrections to the scientific names of amphibians and reptiles". Bonner Zoologische Beiträge 52: 83-94. (Nactus serpensinsula durrellorum [sic], corrected name).

Nactus
Reptiles of Mauritius
Reptiles described in 1951
Endemic fauna of Mauritius
Taxonomy articles created by Polbot